Ian Robert Byrne (born 1972) is a British Labour Party politician. He has been the Member of Parliament (MP) for Liverpool West Derby since the 2019 general election. He is a member of the Socialist Campaign Group parliamentary grouping.

Early life and career
Byrne grew up on the Stockbridge Village (formerly Cantril Farm) estate in Liverpool. At the age of 17 he was present at the Hillsborough disaster and escaped before the crush occurred, however his father was seriously injured.

He worked as a taxi driver while studying at The Open University and gaining a degree over six years. He was an active member of Unite the Union, where he later got a job as a trade union organiser. His work included organising sub-contracted NHS workers for better pay and conditions.

In 2015, Byrne co-founded Fans Supporting Foodbanks, a community initiative by football fans to tackle food poverty in Liverpool. Before becoming an MP, he worked with Dan Carden in the neighbouring constituency of Liverpool Walton.

Political career
In 2018, Byrne was elected as a councillor to Liverpool City Council, representing the Everton ward alongside Labour's Cllr Jane Corbett and Cllr Frank Prendergast MBE. He continued to serve as a local councillor after becoming an MP, donating his councillor's allowance to Vauxhall Law Centre. In 2022, Byrne stood down from his council seat and was succeeded by his daughter, Ellie.

On 3 November 2019, Byrne was selected as the Labour candidate for Liverpool West Derby, after the previous Labour MP Stephen Twigg announced he would be standing down at the 2019 general election. Byrne won the "chaotic" selection process by three votes against Liverpool Wavertree local councillor Angela Coleman.  Byrne apologised when it was reported he had posted racist, misogynistic and homophobic comments on his Facebook account, as well as a comment mocking the disabled; the Facebook account was then deleted. Byrne faced calls to stand down as a candidate following the controversy. Labour shadow Chancellor John McDonnell publicly stood by Byrne's nomination, despite the controversy. On 12 December 2019, Byrne was elected with 77.6% of the vote share, a reduction of 5.2% from the previous election.

Byrne is on the left of the Labour Party and was a supporter of the leadership of Jeremy Corbyn. He is a member of the Socialist Campaign Group and backed his Campaign Group colleagues Rebecca Long-Bailey and Richard Burgon in the 2020 Labour leadership election and deputy leadership election.

In 2020, Byrne launched a campaign for the Right to Food to be written into UK law.

Byrne was named as "Overall MP of the Year" for 2021 by the Patchwork Foundation, who recognized his campaigning against food insecurity and workers' rights during the COVID-19 pandemic.

On 14 December 2021, Byrne voted in favour of the Conservative government's 'Plan B' COVID-19 restrictions, including for an expansion of mask mandates and the introduction of vaccine passports. However, he was one of 22 Labour MPs who voted against mandatory vaccination of NHS staff.

Reselection issues 2022
Durig 2022, Byrne was criticised by some Labour members for putting his interests ahead of more local matters, and for focusing on national campaigns rather than on constituency issues. West Derby Constituency Labour Party branches and affiliates voted to trigger a reselection process for the seat in October 2022. Byrne had raised concerns about his reselection process and threatened to take legal action after alleging multiple rule breaches. Byrne sought police guidance following alleged intimidation, but his version of events was disputed by supporters of his rival, one of whom called on him to apologise.

On 20 November 2022 Byrne was reselected as the candidate for Liverpool West Derby at the next general election.

Personal life
Byrne is a supporter of Liverpool F.C. and a committee member of Liverpool supporters' union Spirit of Shankly.

References

External links
 Twitter
 

1972 births
Living people
People from Knowsley, Merseyside
Councillors in Liverpool
UK MPs 2019–present
Labour Party (UK) MPs for English constituencies
English socialists
Alumni of the Open University
British taxi drivers